Morangos com Açúcar (lit. Strawberries with Sugar; distributed internationally as Sweet Strawberries) is a Portuguese teen drama. It was broadcast daily on the Portuguese TV station TVI between 30 August 2003 to 15 September 2012. The Portuguese show has also been broadcast in Angola, Syria, Brazil, Romania and Galicia.

Format
There are two versions of the show. One airs during the normal school year, and the other one, "Férias de Verão", is a summer series that is aired during the summer months.

From the first to the fourth season, the main scenario was in a private school. The fifth and sixth seasons were mainly in a public school. From the seventh season onwards it was mainly set in a public arts school.

Show history and audience shares

First series (2003–04)
Show Title: Morangos com Açúcar Série I (Strawberries with Sugar Series I)
Premiere Date: 30 August 2003
Finale Date: 6 July 2004
Viewing Share: 30.8%

First summer series (2004)
Show Title: Morangos com Açúcar: Férias de Verão - Série I (Strawberries with Sugar: The Summer Vacation - Series I)
Premiere Date: 7 July 2004
Finale Date: 14 October 2004
Viewing Share: 32.5%

Second series (2004–05)

Show Title: Morangos com Açúcar Série II (Strawberries with Sugar Series II)
Premiere Date: 15 October 2004
Finale Date: 22 June 2005
Viewing Share: 31.7%

Second summer series (2005)
Show Title: Morangos com Açúcar: Férias de Verão - Série II (Strawberries with Sugar: The Summer Vacation - Series II)
Premiere Date: 23 June 2005
Finale Date: 19 September 2005
Viewing Share: 42.1%

Third series (2005–06)
Show Title: Morangos com Açúcar Série III: Geração Rebelde (Strawberries with Sugar Series III: The Rebellious Generation)
Premiere Date: 20 September 2005
Finale Date: 16 June 2006
Viewing Share: 38.9%

Third summer series (2006)
Show Title: Morangos com Açúcar: Férias de Verão - Série III (Strawberries with Sugar: The Summer Vacation - Series III)
Premiere Date: 17 June 2006
Finale Date: 17 September 2006
Viewing Share: 33.0%

Fourth series (2006–07)
Show Title: Morangos com Açúcar Série IV: Espírito Rebelde (Strawberries with Sugar Series IV: The Rebellious Spirit)
Premiere Date: 18 September 2006
Finale Date: 16 June 2007
Viewing Share: 31.0%

Fourth summer series (2007)
Show Title: Morangos com Açúcar: Férias de Verão - Série IV (Strawberries with Sugar: The Summer Vacation - Series IV)
Premiere Date: 17 June 2007
Finale Date: 16 September 2007
Viewing Share: 34.8%

Fifth series (2007–08)
Show Title: Morangos com Açúcar Série V: Geração Rebelde (Strawberries with Sugar Series V: The Rebellious Generation)
Premiere Date: 17 September 2007
Finale Date: Currently Broadcasting
Viewing Share: N/A

Fifth summer series (2008)
Show Title: Morangos com Açúcar: Férias de Verão - Série V (Strawberries with Sugar: The Summer Vacation - Series V)
Premiere Date: June 2008
Finale Date: September 2008
Viewing Share: N/A

Sixth series (2008–09)
Show Title: Morangos com Açúcar Série VI: Geração Rebelde (Strawberries with Sugar Series VI: The Rebellious Generation)
Premiere Date: 22 September 2008
Finale Date: 20 June 2009
Viewing Share: N/A

Sixth summer series (2009)
Show Title: Morangos com Açúcar: Férias de Verão - Série VI (Strawberries with Sugar: The Summer Vacation - Series VI)
Premiere Date: 22 June 2009
Finale Date: September 2009
Viewing Share: N/A

Seventh series (2009-10)
Show Title: Morangos com Açúcar Série VII - Vive o Teu Talento (Strawberries with Sugar: Live Your Talent - Series VII)
Premiere Date: 21 September 2009
Finale Date: 18 June 2010
Viewing Share: N/A

Seventh summer series (2010)
Show Title: Morangos com Açúcar: Vive o Teu Verão - Série VII (Strawberries with Sugar: Live Your Summer - Series VII)
Premier Date: 19 June 2010
Finale Date: 18 September 2010
Viewing Share: N/A

Eighth series (2010-11)
Show Title: Morangos com Açúcar Série VIII - Agarra o Teu Futuro (Strawberries with Sugar: Catch Your Future - Series VIII)
Premiere Date: 20 September 2010
Finale Date: 24 June 2011
Viewing Share: N/A

Eight summer series (2011)
Show Title: Morangos com Açúcar Série VIII - Vive o Teu Verão (Strawberries with Sugar: Live Your Summer - Series VIII)
Premiere Date: 25 June 2011
Finale Date: 9 September 2011
Viewing Share: N/A

Ninth series (2011-12)
Show Title: Morangos com Açúcar Série IX - Persegue o Teu Sonho (Strawberries with Sugar: Follow Your Dream - Series IX)
Premiere Date: 12 September 2011
Finale Date: 12 July 2012
Viewing Share: N/A

Ninth summer series (2012)
Show Title: Morangos com Açúcar Série IX - Férias de Verão (Strawberries with Sugar: The Summer Vacation - Series IX)
Premiere Date: 13 July 2012
Finale Date: 15 September 2012
Viewing Share: N/A

Film (2012)

A film of the series was released on 30 August 2012, and grossed €1,207,647.10.

Mass hysteria

In May 2006, an outbreak of the so-dubbed "Morangos com Açúcar Virus" was reported in Portuguese schools. 300 or more students at 14 schools reported similar symptoms to those experienced by the characters in a then recent episode where a life-threatening virus affected the school depicted in the show. Symptoms of the "virus" included rashes, difficulty breathing, and dizziness. The perceived outbreak forced some schools to temporarily close. The Portuguese National Institute for Medical Emergency eventually dismissed the illness as mass hysteria.

This outbreak raised the concern of some parents regarding the major influence this series has on children who watch it. The story was reported internationally in newspapers, magazines and online.

Cast

Notable cast deaths 
Bernardino Esteves (popularly known as Dino) was portrayed by Francisco Adam. The character was retired from the series after Francisco Adam died in a car accident in April 2006. In the last episode featuring Dino, the character was seen leaving in a hot-air balloon, and threw his favourite orange-coloured hat onto the ground, where his lover, Susana, took it and kept it as a memento. The entire cast of the telenovela appeared and waved goodbye to the character, and the actor who portrayed him.

Celebrities in the series 
Sandra Nasić
Sugababes
Reamonn
Simply Red
Daniel Bedingfield
Marie Serneholt
Greg Minnaar
Asher Lane
Melanie C
Sapo
Sean Kingston
Carlos Andrade
Pimpinha Jardim
EZ Special
Fingertips
Anjos
Nuno Gomes
João Moutinho
Cristovao Vilela
Paula Teixeira
Sofia Escobar
David Carreira
Carlota Pessoa

Child sexual abuse
In July 2012, Henrique Jales was sentenced to five years in prison for sexually abusing a child while casting for the show for TVI.

See also
Cláudia Vieira
Benedita Pereira
Joana Solnado
Hélio Pestana
Mafalda Pinto
Teresa Tavares
Dalila Carmo
Patrícia Candoso
Francisco Adam
Dânia Neto
Ana Guiomar
Patrícia Tavares
Liliana Santos
Júlia Belard

References

External links 
Official Site
 Morangos com Açúcar

2003 Portuguese television series debuts
2012 Portuguese television series endings
2000s teen drama television series
2010s teen drama television series
Portuguese telenovelas
Portuguese-language telenovelas
Portuguese drama television series
Televisão Independente telenovelas